The BYD G6 is a mid-sized four-door saloon produced by the Chinese manufacturer BYD launched in September 2011.

G6 

Sirui 
Just like the Surui trim of BYD F3, Sirui is a more premium version of the G6, with different styling and configurations.

References

G6
Mid-size cars
Sedans
Cars of China

Cars introduced in 2011